Perry County is  a county in the Commonwealth of Pennsylvania. As of the 2020 census, the population was 45,842. The county seat is New Bloomfield. The county was created on March 22, 1820, and was named for Oliver Hazard Perry, a hero of the War of 1812, who had recently died. It was originally part of Cumberland County and was created in part because residents did not want to travel over the mountain to Carlisle, the county seat of Cumberland County. Landisburg became the temporary county seat before New Bloomfield was ultimately chosen.

Perry County is included in the Harrisburg–York–Lebanon combined statistical area. The county is served by the 717/223 area codes.

In 2010, the center of population of Pennsylvania was located in the eastern end of Perry County. Green Park, an unincorporated village located in northeastern Tyrone Township, serves as Perry County's midpoint between the Conococheague Mountain in the west and the Susquehanna River to the east.

Geography

The county terrain is formed by the folded Appalachian Mountain ridges which run from southwest to northeast across the county. The terrain slopes to the northeast, with its highest point on the Blue Mountain Ridge, which delineates the border between Perry and Cumberland counties. The ridge peaks at 0.83 mile (1.33 km) NE from Perry County's southmost corner; it measures 2,269' (692m) ASL. The county is drained by the south-flowing Susquehanna River, which forms almost all of its eastern boundary. The Juniata River enters Perry County from Juniata County near Millerstown, and flows southeast to its confluence with the Susquehanna River near Duncannon. The county also contains several creeks, runs, and lakes, which provide recreational and fishing opportunities, formerly powered mills throughout the county and provided transport venues. To this day, canoeing and kayaking are forms of recreation which utilise the Sherman Creek and other waters in the county.

The Appalachian Trail runs through the town of Duncannon. The county is also famous for being the northern head of the Tuscarora Trail.

Perry County has a hot-summer humid continental climate (Dfa) and average monthly temperatures in New Bloomfield range from 28.5 °F in January to 73.2 °F in July.  The hardiness zone is 6b except in Marysville where it is 7a.   Common trees include red maple, Virginia pine, oak, eastern white pine, eastern hemlock, birch, shagbark hickory, and juniper, though American sycamore, ironwood, sugar maple, black walnut, elm, alder, and sassafras are also fairly common. Mosses of various species are common sights, especially on fallen tree logs, along streams, on tree trunks, and in sidewalk cracks, usually growing in shaded areas. Ferns also grow along streams and in shaded areas, and are also commonly seen in Perry County woodlands.

Adjacent counties

 Juniata County - north
 Northumberland County - northeast
 Dauphin County - east
 Cumberland County - south
 Franklin County - southwest

Major highways

Protected areas

 Big Spring State Forest Picnic Area
 Fowlers Hollow State Park
 Little Buffalo State Park
 Colonel Denning State Park (part)
 Hoverter and Sholl Box Huckleberry Natural Area
 State Game Lands Number 88
 State Game Lands Number 170
 State Game Lands Number 256
 State Game Lands Number 281
 Tuscarora State Forest (part)

Demographics

2000 census
As of the 2000 United States Census, there were 43,602 people, 16,695 households, and 12,320 families in the county. The population density was 79.1/sqmi (30.6/km2). There were 18,941 housing units at an average density of 34.4/sqmi (13.3/km2). The racial makeup of the county was 98.54% White, 0.43% Black or African American, 0.12% Native American, 0.15% Asian, 0.01% Pacific Islander, 0.21% from other races, and 0.54% from two or more races.  0.69% of the population were Hispanic or Latino of any race. 45.8% were of German, 16.4% American, 7.8% Irish and 5.0% English ancestry. 96.8% spoke English and 1.2% Spanish as their first language.

There were 16,695 households, out of which 33.2% had children under the age of 18 living with them, 61.6% were married couples living together, 7.8% had a female householder with no husband present, and 26.20% were non-families. 21.7% of all households were made up of individuals, and 9.30% had someone living alone who was 65 years of age or older.  The average household size was 2.58 and the average family size was 3.01. There is also a high population of Anabaptist communities, such as Amish and Mennonites.

The county population contained 25.5% under the age of 18, 7.4% from 18 to 24, 29.8% from 25 to 44, 25.1% from 45 to 64, and 12.3% who were 65 years of age or older. The median age was 38 years. For every 100 females, there were 98.4 males. For every 100 females age 18 and over, there were 96.9 males.

2020 Census

Metropolitan Statistical Area
The United States Office of Management and Budget has designated Perry County as the Harrisburg-Carlisle, PA Metropolitan Statistical Area (MSA). As of the 2010 census the metropolitan area ranked 6th most populous in the State of Pennsylvania and the 96th most populous in the United States, with its population of 549,475. Perry County is also a part of the larger Harrisburg–York–Lebanon combined statistical area (CSA), which combines the populations of Perry County as well as Adams, Cumberland, Dauphin, Lebanon and York Counties in Pennsylvania. The Combined Statistical Area ranked 5th in the State of Pennsylvania and 43rd most populous in the United States with a population of 1,219,422.

County Government

Commissioners
 Brian S. Allen, Chair (R)
 Gary R. Eby, Vice Chair (R)
 Brenda L. Watson, Secretary (D)
(as of January 2020)

Sheriff
 David Hammar, Republican
(as of January 2020)

State Senate
 Greg Rothman, Republican, Pennsylvania's 34th Senate District

State House of Representatives
 Perry A. Stambaugh, Republican, Pennsylvania's 86th Representative District

United States House of Representatives
 Fred Keller, Republican, Pennsylvania's 12th congressional district

United States Senate
 John Fetterman, Democrat
 Bob Casey Jr., Democrat

Emergency services
The county's emergency services are located in the basement of the Perry County Courthouse. The 911 center's coverage area includes almost all of Perry County and portions of Juniata and Dauphin Counties.

Politics
In 2016, Donald J. Trump received 73.07% of the presidential vote, compared to 21.67% to Hillary Clinton, and 5.26% for candidates Gary Johnson, write-ins, Jill Stein, and Darrell L. Castle, respectively. The county has voted for the Republican in every presidential election since 1964. In 2006, Lynn Swann received 9,998 votes (69%) to 4,477 votes (31%) for Ed Rendell, making it Swann's strongest county in his defeat. Rick Santorum also received more than 60% of the Perry County vote in his defeat.

|}

Education

Public School Districts
 Greenwood School District (also covers parts of Juniata County).
 Newport School District
 Susquenita School District (also covers parts of Dauphin County).
 West Perry School District
 Fannett-Metal School District (located in Franklin County, but covers parts of Perry County).

Intermediate unit
The Capital Area Intermediate Unit 15 is a state approved education agency that offers to Perry County school districts, charter schools, private schools, and home school students, a variety of services including: a completely developed K-12 curriculum that is mapped and aligned with the Pennsylvania Academic Standards (available online), shared services, a joint purchasing program and a wide variety of special education and special needs services.

Private schools
As reported on EdNA (ED Names and Addresses) by the Pennsylvania Department of Education:

 Blue Goose Children's Learning Center, Inc – Newport
 Carson Long Military Institute
 Clarks Run Parochial School – Blain 
 Community Christian Academy – Newport 
 Farm Lane School – Ickesburg
 Fowlers Hollow School – Blain	
 Heritage Christian School – West Perry 
 Honeysuckle Ridge School – Elliotsburg 
 Kuddly Bear Child Care Center Inc. – Duncannon
 Loysville Youth Development Center – Loysville
 Manassa School – Blain
 Messiah Day Care Center – Elliottsburg
 Mountain View Parochial School – Ickesburg	 
 Perry View Parochial School – Landisburg 
 Raccoon Valley Amish School – Millerstown
 Shermans View School – Loysville
 Stony Point School – Loysville
 Sunset Valley School – Millerstown

Trade schools
 Central Pennsylvania Diesel Institute – Liverpool

Public libraries
 New Bloomfield Public Library
 Community Library of Western Perry County
 Marysville-Rye Public Library
 Newport Public Library

Media

Newspapers
The county is home to four weekly newspapers, three published by Advance Publications of Perry and Juniata Counties, Inc. associated with The Patriot-News of Harrisburg: Duncannon Record, The News-Sun, and Perry County Times. The Perry County Weekly is published by The Sentinel in Carlisle, Cumberland County, by Lee Enterprises of Davenport, Iowa.

Books
There are numerous historical books written about the county, available at the Council of the Arts in Newport as well as other establishments. They cover various topics of the county's past, including an historical overview of the Blain area; an account of the life of the early settlers along the Shermans Creek in three townships; and an account of a Civil War battle on Sterrett's Gap.

Communities

Under Pennsylvania law, there are four types of incorporated municipalities: cities, boroughs, townships, and, in at most two cases, towns. The following boroughs and townships are located in Perry County:

Boroughs

 Blain
 Duncannon
 Landisburg
 Liverpool
 Marysville
 Millerstown
 New Bloomfield (county seat)
 New Buffalo
 Newport

Unincorporated communities

 Acker
 Andersonburg
 Alinda
 Amity Hall
 Aqueduct
 Bailey
 Bixler
 Bridgeport
 Centre
 Center Square
 Cisna Run
 Couchtown
 Cove
 Crums Corners
 Dellville
 Donnally Mills
 Dromgold
 Elliottsburg
 Erly
 Eshcol
 Everhartville
 Falling Spring
 Fort Robertson
 Glenvale
 Gramere
 Green Park
 Half Falls
 Ickesburg
 Juniata Furnace
 Keystone
 Kinkora Heights
 Kistler
 Little Germany
 Losh Run
 Loysville
 Mannsville
 Marklesville
 McKee
 Mecks Corner
 Milltown
 Montebello
 Montgomery Ferry
 Mount Patrick
 Mount Pleasant
 Nekoda
 New Germantown
 Oakgrove
 Old Ferry
 Perdix
 Pine Grove
 Pfoutz Valley
 Reward
 Rose Glen
 Roseburg
 Saville
 Seyoc
 Shermans Dale
 Stony Point
 Sundy Place
 Wahneta
 Walnut Grove
 Wardville
 Wila

Townships

 Buffalo
 Carroll
 Centre
 Greenwood
 Howe
 Jackson
 Juniata
 Liverpool
 Miller
 Northeast Madison
 Oliver
 Penn
 Rye
 Saville
 Southwest Madison
 Spring
 Toboyne
 Tuscarora
 Tyrone
 Watts
 Wheatfield

Population ranking
The population ranking of the following table is based on the 2010 census of Perry County.

† county seat

Economy

Perry County's economy is primarily agricultural. Various farmers markets, roadside stands, farm produce stands, food festivals, resale farm stands, meat stores, and plant nurseries are present throughout the county. Two farms in Perry County are particularly well known, which are Spiral Path Farm and Yeehaw Farm, with the latter having been spotlighted by the Washington Post. The county's area is 38.3% farmland, of which 11.09% (thus 4.24% of all land in the county) is pastureland.

Perry County also hosts a wide range of non-agricultural businesses. Historically, mills were prevalent, and the county currently has 21 known non-operational mills still standing. Settlement was not allowed until 1755, and when settlement was allowed, it was not safe: in June 1755, Native Americans chased nearly all of the pioneers out, until it was considered safe to return in 1762. The first mill was taxed in 1763, though the exact date of its completion is not known.

Nearly every stream's basin hosted a sawmill, providing wood for early buildings and boardwalks.

Recreation
The county has a variety of recreation facilities. There are three state parks: Fowlers Hollow State Park, Little Buffalo State Park, and Big Spring State Forest Picnic Area. The Hoverter and Sholl Box Huckleberry Natural Area is found near New Bloomfield along Huckleberry Road. Carroll Township Park also offers a wide variety of athletic facilities.

Pools: Liverpool Pool (Jann Deitzler Memorial Pool), Millerstown Pool, New Bloomfield Pool, and Little Buffalo State Park Pool

Trails: Hawk Rock Trail and Iron Horse Trail

State Game Lands: #170 Dellville, #254 New Buffalo, #256-Mecks Corner and #281 Miller Township. Hunting requires licenses from the PA Game Commission.

Gallery

See also
 National Register of Historic Places listings in Perry County, Pennsylvania

References

External links
 Perry County official website

 
1820 establishments in Pennsylvania
Counties of Appalachia
Harrisburg–Carlisle metropolitan statistical area
Populated places established in 1820